The Smith & Wesson Model 410 and 411  are two similar full-sized, .40 S&W, short-recoil-operated double-action/single action (DA/SA) semi-automatic pistols with a four-inch barrel and an aluminum alloy frame and a carbon steel slide.  The S&W Model 411 was produced from 1992 to 1994.  The S&W Model 410 was introduced in 1995 as a replacement for the Model 411 and was manufactured through 2006.

Specifications
Model: 410/411
Caliber: .40 S&W
Capacity: 10+1/11+1 Rounds
Barrel Length: 4"
Front Sight: Dot Front Sight
Rear Sight: Fixed
Grip: Plastic Grip
Frame: Large
Finish: Blue / Black
Overall Length: 7"
Material: Alloy
Weight Empty: 28.5 oz.

Smith & Wesson semi-automatic pistols
Police weapons
.40 S&W semi-automatic pistols